The 1989–90 Richmond Spiders men's basketball team represented the University of Richmond in National Collegiate Athletic Association (NCAA) Division I college basketball during the 1989–90 season. Richmond competed as a member of the Colonial Athletic Association (CAA) under head basketball coach Dick Tarrant and played its home games at the Robins Center.

Richmond finished second in the CAA regular-season standings with a 10–4 conference record, and won the CAA tournament to earn an automatic bid to the 1990 NCAA tournament. In the opening round of the East regional, the #14 seed Spiders fell to #3 seed Duke, 81–46, to finish with a 22–10 record.

Roster

Schedule and results

|-
!colspan=9 style=| Regular season

|-
!colspan=9 style=| CAA Tournament

|-
!colspan=9 style=| NCAA Tournament

References

Richmond Spiders men's basketball seasons
Richmond
1990 in sports in Virginia
1989 in sports in Virginia
Richmond